Sivapuram  is a village in Kannur district in the Indian state of Kerala.

Educational institutions

Professional colleges

 St. Thomas College of Engineering and Technology (STM)

Demographics
As of 2011  Census, Sivapuram had a population of 16,047 with 7,651 males and 8,396 females. The average sex ratio was 1097 higher than the state average of 1084. In Sivapuram, 11.5% of the population was under 6 years of age. Sivapuram had an average literacy of 94.1% higher than state average of 94%.

Geographics
Sivapuram is mainly divided into Thazhe Sivapuram and  Meethal Sivapuram (Padupara). Thazhe Sivapuram is one of the older towns within the trade routes of ancient Kerala and Padupara is famous for tourism, especially the Microme Hill View Point, and its pilgrimages like the Meethal Juma Masjid. This masjid is one of the main Islamic pilgrimages and a point of prominence in Kannur district. The majority of Muslims who follow Sikhaf Waliullahi lived here. His Makkham is also situated in Meethal Sivapuram.

Tourism
There are many tourist destinations in this small village town. The people here are known for their hospitality.
The Microme Hill View Point is the major point of attraction here which is known to be visited by more than a thousand visitors every day.

Transportation
The national highway passes through Kannur town.  Goa and Mumbai can be accessed on the northern side and Cochin and Thiruvananthapuram can be accessed on the southern side.  The road to the east of Iritty connects to Mysore and Bangalore.   The nearest railway station is Kannur on Mangalore-Palakkad line. 
Trains are available to almost all parts of India subject to advance booking over the internet.  There are airports at Mattanur, Mangalore and Calicut. All of them are international airports but direct flights are available only to Middle Eastern countries.

References

Villages near Kannur airport
Villages in Kannur district